Sick's Stadium, also known as Sick's Seattle Stadium and later as Sicks' Stadium, was a baseball park in the northwest United States in Seattle, Washington. It was located in Rainier Valley, on the NE corner of S. McClellan Street and Rainier Avenue S (currently the site of a Lowe's hardware store). The longtime home of the Seattle Rainiers of the Pacific Coast League (PCL), it hosted the expansion Seattle Pilots during their only major league season in 1969.

The site was previously the location of Dugdale Field, a 1913 ballpark that was the home of the Rainiers' forerunners, the Seattle Indians. That park burned down in an Independence Day arson fire in 1932, caused by serial arsonist Robert Driscoll. Authorities would later claim that Driscoll was one of the most dangerous arsonists in the United States during the Great Depression. Until a new stadium could be built on the Dugdale site, the team played at Civic Field, a converted football stadium at the current location of Seattle Center's Memorial Stadium.

Baseball

Minor league years
Sick's Stadium first opened in 1938 on June 15 as the home field of the Seattle Rainiers (the renamed Seattle Indians) of the Pacific Coast League (PCL). It was named after Emil Sick, owner of the team and of the Rainier Brewing Company. The Rainiers played at the stadium through 1964, after which they were renamed the Seattle Angels, but continued to play at Sick's through 1968. In 1946, the stadium was briefly the home of the Negro league Seattle Steelheads of the short-lived West Coast Negro Baseball Association, who played at the stadium while the Rainiers were on the road.

After Emil Sick died in 1964, and various members of his family shared ownership, the name of the park was changed to reflect that fact, from the singular possessive form "Sick's Stadium" to the plural possessive form "Sicks' Stadium".

The city bought the stadium in 1965, in anticipation that part of the property was needed for a proposed freeway.

The field alignment was southeast, home plate to center field, which results in difficult visibility conditions for the left side of the defense in the early evening hours. The recommended alignment is east-northeast.

Seattle Pilots
On April 11, 1969, Major League Baseball came to Washington’s largest city with the American League expansion Seattle Pilots debuting at Sick's Stadium. Seattle had been mentioned several times as a prospective major league city. However, Sick's Stadium had not aged gracefully. While it had once been considered one of the best stadiums in the minors, by the 1960s it was considered well behind the times. The Cleveland Indians considered moving there in the early part of the decade, but owner William Daley decided against it because he did not think that Sick's Stadium was suitable for a major league team. Charlie Finley considered moving the Kansas City Athletics to Seattle in 1967, but when he came to scout out Sick's Stadium, he quipped that it was aptly named. He advised Seattle officials to get a new stadium if it wanted a major league team. When the American League granted the franchise in October 1967, it explicitly stated that Sick's Stadium was not suitable as a major league facility, and was only to be used on a temporary basis until a domed stadium could be completed.

It soon became obvious why Daley (who bought a stake in the Pilots) and Finley were wary about Sick's. The franchise agreement required the Pilots to expand Sick's Stadium to 30,000 seats by the start of the 1969 season. However, due to cost overruns, poor weather and other delays, only 17,000 seats were ready by opening day. Several of the 17,150 people who showed up had to wait three innings to take their seats because workers were still putting them together by the time of the first pitch. In the Pilots' defense, original plans called for them to begin play in 1971. However, the date was moved up two years when Senator Stuart Symington of Missouri demanded that the Pilots' expansion brethren, the Kansas City Royals, be ready for play in 1969. Professional baseball had been played in Kansas City in one form or another from  until the A's left for Oakland after the 1967 season, and Symington would not accept the prospect of Kansas City having to wait three years for baseball to return. This forced Seattle to start play in 1969 as well in order to balance the schedule.

The stadium expanded to 25,000 seats by June, but many of those seats had obstructed views. There were no field-level camera pits, so photographers had to set up their equipment atop the grandstand roof. The clubhouse facilities were second-class. Also, no upgrades were made to the stadium's piping, resulting in almost nonexistent water pressure after the seventh inning, especially when crowds exceeded 10,000. This forced players to shower in their hotel rooms or at home after the game. The visiting team's announcers couldn't see any plays along third base or left field. The Pilots had to place a mirror in the press box, and the visiting announcers had to look into it and "refract" plays in those areas. By the middle of the season, it was obvious that Sick's Stadium was completely inadequate even for temporary use.

Under the circumstances, only 678,000 fans came to see the Pilots, 20th out of 24 teams—a major reason why the team was forced into bankruptcy after only one season. Despite the poor stadium conditions, the ticket prices were among the highest in the major leagues. The team was sold out of bankruptcy court to a Milwaukee-based group on March 31, and the team moved at the end of spring training for the 1970 season and became the Milwaukee Brewers (Milwaukee had lost the Braves to Atlanta after the 1965 season).

After two years without pro baseball, Seattle fielded a second Rainiers team that played in the Class A Northwest League between 1972 and 1976 before giving way to the major league Mariners at the Kingdome. The last professional baseball game at Sicks' Stadium was played September 1, 1976, when local product George Meyring pitched a 2-0 shutout for the Rainiers over the rival Portland Mavericks.

Concerts and other events
Though Sick's Stadium was primarily a baseball venue, it also occasionally held other events, including rock concerts — most famously, an Elvis Presley concert on September 1, 1957 (one of the first concerts to be held at a major outdoor stadium), which was attended by a young Jimi Hendrix. The Sunday night concert followed an afternoon ball game during the Labor Day weekend. Hendrix himself later performed at the stadium in the rain on July 26, 1970, as did Janis Joplin, just months before their respective deaths.

In boxing, Floyd Patterson knocked out Olympic gold medalist Pete Rademacher in six rounds on August 22, 1957. Future heavyweight champion Sonny Liston defeated Portland's Eddie Machen in a 12-round decision at Sick's on September 7, 1960.

After the Pilots

From 1972 to 1976, a new Seattle Rainiers team, in the short-season Class A Northwest League, played at Sicks' to sparse audiences. The major leagues returned in 1977 with the expansion Seattle Mariners at the new Kingdome (originally approved by area voters as a condition of getting the Pilots).

The Washington Huskies baseball team used the venue during the 1973 season while their on-campus venue, Graves Field, was renovated.

In 1979, Sicks' Stadium was demolished, and an Eagle Hardware & Garden store opened there in 1992, which became a Lowe's home improvement store in 1999. The stadium site is currently marked by a sign (on the corner of Rainier and McClellan) and a replica of home plate (near the store's exit) as well as markings inside the store where the bases were.  from home plate, near the cash registers, is a circle where the mound and pitching rubber were. The store has a glass display case containing mementos of the Pilots, Rainiers, and Angels.

Most of the primary assets of Sick's were bought for $60,000 in 1978 by Harry Ornest, the owner of the new Vancouver Canadians for use at Nat Bailey Stadium in Vancouver, British Columbia. Another purchaser was Washington State University in Pullman, which bought bleachers, fencing, and the foul poles in 1979 to construct the new Buck Bailey Field. The bleachers did not fit well and were later sold.

Several dozen box seats from Sicks' Stadium were transported to Alaska and installed in Growden Memorial Park in Fairbanks, which hosts collegiate summer baseball.

References

Further reading
 Sicks Stadium Photos and History: http://digitalballparks.com/American/Sicks.html
Ballparks.com: Sick's Stadium page
"From Reds to Ruth to Rainiers: City's history has its hits, misses": an article on the history of Seattle's ballparks, from the Seattle Post-Intelligencer
"All Shook Up: Elvis Rocks Sicks' Stadium" at HistoryLink
"Sick's Stadium" Ibid.
A Short History of Seattle Baseball
Allen, Rick (2020). Inside Pitch: Insiders Reveal How the Ill-Fated Seattle Pilots Got Played into Bankruptcy in One Year. Tacoma, WA: Persistence Press. .

External links
Ballpark Digest article on Sick's Stadium
Clem's Baseball:Sick's Stadium page with stadium diagram and statistics
UW Library photo: Sick's Stadium, 1969
Sanborn map showing Sick's Stadium, 1950

History of Seattle
Washington Huskies baseball venues
Defunct baseball venues in the United States
Defunct minor league baseball venues
Defunct Major League Baseball venues
Seattle Pilots stadiums
Baseball venues in Seattle
1938 establishments in Washington (state)
1976 disestablishments in Washington (state)
Sports venues demolished in 1979
Sports venues completed in 1938
Demolished sports venues in Washington (state)